Year 1496 (MCDXCVI) was a leap year starting on Friday (link will display the full calendar) of the Julian calendar.

Events 
 January–December 
 February – Pietro Bembo's Petri Bembi de Aetna Angelum Chalabrilem liber, a description of a journey to Mount Etna, is published in Venice by Aldus Manutius, the first book printed in the old-style serif or humanist typeface cut by Francesco Griffo (known from the 20th century as Bembo) and with early adoption of the semicolon (dated 1495 according to the more veneto).
 February 24 – King Henry VII of England signs the commercial treaty Intercursus Magnus with Venice, Florence, and the cities of the Hanseatic League and the Netherlands.
 March 5 – Henry VII of England issues letters patent to Italian-born adventurer John Cabot and his sons, authorizing them to discover unknown lands.
 March 10 – Christopher Columbus leaves Hispaniola for Spain, ending his second visit to the Western Hemisphere. During his time here he has forcibly subjugated the island, enslaved the Taíno, and laid the basis for a system of land grants tied to the Taíno's enslavement.
 June 12 – Jesus College, Cambridge, is founded.
 July – Spanish forces under Gonzalo Fernández de Córdoba capture Atella after a siege. Among the prisoners is the French viceroy of Naples, the Comte de Montpensier. Ferdinand II of Naples is restored to his throne.
 August 5 – Bartholomew Columbus, brother of Christopher Columbus, formally founds the city of Santo Domingo (first settled in March) on Hispaniola (in the modern-day Dominican Republic), making it the oldest permanent European settlement in the New World.
 September 21–25 – James IV of Scotland invades Northumberland, in support of the pretender to the English throne, Perkin Warbeck.
 October 20 – Joanna of Castile, second daughter of Ferdinand II of Aragon and Isabella I of Castile, heiress to Castile, marries the archduke Philip, heir through his mother to the Burgundian Netherlands, and through his father to the Holy Roman Empire.
 December 5 – King Manuel I of Portugal issues a decree ordering the expulsion of "heretics" from the country.
 Date unknown – Jan de Groote, a Dutchman, obtains a grant for the north ferry from the mainland of Scotland to Orkney, from King James IV of Scotland.

Births 
 March 18 – Mary Tudor, Queen of Louis XII of France, daughter of Henry VII of England (d. 1533)
 May 12 – King Gustav I of Sweden (d. 1560)
 July 10 – Johann Forster, German theologian (d. 1558)
 August 28 – Konrad Heresbach, German Calvinist (d. 1576)
 September 27 – Hieronymus Łaski, Polish diplomat (d. 1542)
 October 20 – Claude, Duke of Guise, French aristocrat and general (d. 1550)
 November 23 – Clément Marot, French poet of the Renaissance period (d. 1544)
 December 20 – Joseph ha-Kohen, Spanish-born French Jewish historian and physician (d. 1575)
 December 21 – Elisabeth Corvinus, Hungarian princess (d. 1508)
 date unknown
 Lazare de Baïf, French diplomat and author (d. 1547)
 João de Barros, Portuguese historian (d. 1570)
 Cuauhtémoc, 11th Tlatoani (emperor) of Tenochtitlan (modern Mexico City), 1520–1521, (d. 1521)
 Dirck Jacobsz., Dutch painter (d. 1567)
 Richard Maitland, Scottish poet (d. 1586)
 Louise de Montmorency, French noblewoman (d. 1547)
 Martín Ocelotl, Mexican priest (d. c. 1537)
 William Roper, son-in-law and biographer of Thomas More (d. 1578)
 Giovanni Battista da Sangallo, Italian architect (d. 1548)
 Menno Simons, Dutch Anabaptist leader (d. 1561)
 Agostino Steuco, Italian humanist scholar (d. 1548)
 Johann Walter, Lutheran composer and poet (d. 1570)
 probable – Henry Somerset, 2nd Earl of Worcester (d. 1549)
 María Pacheco, Spanish heroine and defender of Toledo (d. 1531)

Deaths 
 January 1 – Charles, Count of Angoulême (b. 1459)
 February 24 – Eberhard I, Duke of Württemberg (b. 1445)
 March 4 – Sigismund, Archduke of Austria (b. 1427)
 March 12 – Johann Heynlin, German humanist scholar (b. c. 1425)
 April 16 – Charles II, Duke of Savoy (b. 1489)
 April 29 – Fernando de Almada, 2nd Count of Avranches (b. c. 1430)
 August 15 – Infanta Isabella of Portugal, Queen of Castile and León (b. 1428)
 September 7 – King Ferdinand II of Naples (b. 1469)
 September 15 – Hugh Clopton, Lord Mayor of London (b. c. 1440)
 September 25 – Piero Capponi, Italian soldier and statesman (b. 1447)
 September 28 – Boček IV of Poděbrady, Bohemian nobleman, eldest son of King George of Podebrady (b. 1442)
 October 15 – Gilbert, Count of Montpensier (b. 1443)
 November 1 – Filippo Buonaccorsi (Filip Callimachus), Italian humanist writer (b. 1437)
 date unknown
 Richard Bell, Bishop of Carlisle
 Alexander Inglis, Scottish clergyman
 Pietro di Francesco degli Orioli, Italian sculptor (b. c. 1458)
 Piero del Pollaiuolo, Italian painter (b. 1443)
 Qaitbay, sultan of Egypt
 Ercole de' Roberti, Italian artist (b. c. 1451)
 probable – Jan IV of Oświęcim, duke of Oświęcim

References